John Aloysius "Jack" Mahoney SJ (born 14 January 1931) is a Scottish Jesuit, moral theologian, and academic, specialising in applied ethics and business ethics. He was principal of Heythrop College, London from 1976 to 1981, F. D. Maurice Professor of Moral and Social Theology at King's College, London from 1986 to 1993, and Dixons Professor of Business Ethics and Social Responsibility at the London Business School from 1993 to 1998. He was also Gresham Professor of Commerce between 1988 and 1993.

Selected works

References

1931 births
Living people
Scottish Jesuits
British ethicists
Academics of Heythrop College
Academics of King's College London
Academics of London Business School
Professors of Gresham College
Scottish Roman Catholic theologians
20th-century Scottish theologians
21st-century Scottish theologians
Roman Catholic moral theologians
Jesuit theologians